Kangavar-e Kohneh (also Romanized as Kangāvar-e Kohneh and Kangāvar Kohneh; also known as Kangarvar-i-Kuhna) is a village in Khezel-e Sharqi Rural District, Khezel District, Nahavand County, Hamadan Province, Iran. At the 2006 census, its population was 335, in 85 families.

References 

Populated places in Nahavand County